The Valley of Decision is a biblical name given to the Valley of Jehoshaphat and the scene of Jehovah's signal inflictions on Zion's enemies.

Valley of Decision may also refer to:
 Valley of Decision (Christafari album), 1996
 The Valley of Decision (novel), a 1942 novel by Marcia Davenport
 The Valley of Decision, a 1945 film adaptation of the book
 The Valley of Decision (1916 film), starring Joan Bennett
  The Valley of Decision (1902 novel), by Edith Wharton
 Valley of Decision (The Gladiators album), a 1991 album by The Gladiators